The Nicholls Colonels are the 15 teams representing Nicholls State University, a university in Louisiana, in intercollegiate athletics. The Colonels compete in the NCAA Division I and the Colonels football team competes in the NCAA Division I Football Championship Subdivision (FCS). The Colonels sports teams are members of the Southland Conference.

Nickname
The Nicholls State University official team nickname is the "Colonels". The nickname was chosen because the university was once a ROTC dominated school and the highest rank in ROTC is a Colonel.

History

Conference affiliations

* From 1982–84, Nicholls (then athletically branded as "Nicholls State") was a provisional member of the Trans America Athletic Conference (TAAC).
Men's sports – Only baseball played TAAC conference games

Sports sponsored

Baseball

The Nicholls Colonels baseball team is the varsity intercollegiate baseball team of Nicholls State University in Thibodaux, Louisiana, United States. The team is a member of the Southland Conference, which is part of the NCAA Division I. Nicholls' first baseball team was fielded in 1960. The team plays its home games at 2,100-seat Ben Meyer Diamond at Ray E. Didier Field and are coached by Mike Silva.

Men's basketball

The Nicholls Colonels men's basketball team represents Nicholls State University in Thibodaux, Louisiana, United States. The school's team currently competes in the Southland Conference, which is part of the NCAA Division I. Nicholls' first men's basketball team was fielded during the 1958–59 season. The team plays its home games at 3,800-seat Stopher Gymnasium and are coached by Austin Claunch.

Women's basketball

The Nicholls Colonels women's basketball team represents Nicholls State University in Thibodaux, Louisiana, United States. The school's team currently competes in the Southland Conference, which is part of the NCAA Division I. Nicholls' first women's basketball team was fielded during the 1974–75 season. The team plays its home games at 3,800-seat Stopher Gymnasium and are coached by DoBee Plaisance.

Women's beach volleyball
The Nicholls Colonels women's beach volleyball team represents Nicholls State University in Thibodaux, Louisiana, United States. Nicholls launched its beach volleyball program in the 2019 season (2018–19 school year), and played its first season as an independent. The Colonels now compete in the Southland Conference, which added beach volleyball as an official conference sport for the 2020 season. The team is coached by Kallie Noble.

Cross country

The Nicholls Colonels cross country program represents Nicholls State University in Thibodaux, Louisiana, United States. The program includes separate men's and women's cross country teams, both of which compete in the Southland Conference, which is part of the NCAA Division I. The teams are coached by Stefanie Slekis.

Football

The Nicholls Colonels football program is the intercollegiate American football team for Nicholls State University located in Thibodaux, Louisiana, United States. The team competes in the NCAA Division I Football Championship Subdivision (FCS) and are members of the Southland Conference. Nicholls' first football team was fielded in 1972. The team plays its home games at the 10,500 seat Manning Field at John L. Guidry Stadium in Thibodaux, Louisiana. The Colonels are coached by Tim Rebowe.

Men's golf
The Nicholls Colonels men's golf team represents Nicholls State University in Thibodaux, Louisiana, United States. The school's team currently competes in the Southland Conference, which is part of the NCAA Division I. The team plays their home tournaments at the LaTour Golf Club in Mathews, Louisiana and are currently led by head coach James Schilling.

Women's soccer

The Nicholls Colonels women's soccer team represents Nicholls State University in Thibodaux, Louisiana, United States. The school's team currently competes in the Southland Conference, which is part of the NCAA Division I. Nicholls' first soccer team was fielded in 1998. The team plays its home games at the 1,000-seat Nicholls Soccer Complex through the 2021 season.  The Colonels moved to the newly constructed multi-purpose field at the Thibodaux Regional Sports Complex in 2022.  The team is coached by Robert Podeyn.

Softball

The Nicholls Colonels softball team represents Nicholls State University in NCAA Division I college softball. The team participates in the Southland Conference. Nicholls first softball team was fielded in 1981. The team plays its home games at 500-seat Swanner Field at Geo Surfaces Park and are coached by Angel Santiago.

Men's tennis
The Nicholls Colonels men's tennis team represents Nicholls State University in Thibodaux, Louisiana, United States. The school's team currently competes in the Southland Conference, which is part of the NCAA Division I. The team plays its home matches at the Colonel Tennis Complex and are coached by Greg Harkins.

Women's tennis
The Nicholls Colonels women's tennis team represents Nicholls State University in Thibodaux, Louisiana, United States. The school's team currently competes in the Southland Conference, which is part of the NCAA Division I. The team plays its home matches at the Colonel Tennis Complex and are coached by Greg Harkins.

Women's track and field

The Nicholls Colonels women's track and field program represents Nicholls State University in Thibodaux, Louisiana, United States. The program includes women's indoor and outdoor track and field teams, both of which compete in the Southland Conference, which is part of the NCAA Division I. The teams are coached by Stefanie Slekis.

Women's volleyball

The Nicholls Colonels women's volleyball team represents Nicholls State University in Thibodaux, Louisiana, United States. The school's team currently competes in the Southland Conference, which is part of the NCAA Division I. Nicholls' first volleyball team was fielded in 1975. The team plays its home games at 3,800-seat Stopher Gymnasium and are coached by Kallie Noble.

Former varsity sports
Women's golf — Dropped in 2009 due to budget constraints
Men's track and field (indoor and outdoor) — Dropped in 2004 and replaced by men's tennis

Championships
Conference championships
BaseballRegular Season: 1974, '76, '85Tournament: 1984, '98
Men's BasketballRegular Season: 1976, '79, '95, '98, 2018, '21Tournament: 1995, '98
Women's BasketballTournament: 2018
Football1975, '84, 2005, '18, '19Playoff appearances: 1986, '96, 2005, '17, '18, '19
SoftballRegular Season: 1992, '94–'96, 2018Tournament: 1996, '97

Athletic facilities
The following is a list of the athletic facilities for the Nicholls Colonels. It includes Nicholls' outdoor stadiums, indoor arenas, golf courses, running courses, and training and practice facilities.

Manning Field at John L. Guidry StadiumManning Field at John L. Guidry Stadium is a 10,500-seat multi-purpose stadium in Thibodaux, Louisiana. It is home to the Nicholls Colonels football team of the Southland Conference in the Football Championship Subdivision (FCS). The stadium is named in honor of former state representative John L. Guidry who was instrumental in the establishment of Francis T. Nicholls Junior College. The playing surface is named Manning Field after the Manning family (Peyton, Eli, Cooper and Archie) because the family holds the annual Manning Passing Academy football camp at the facility. In 2021, Nicholls State University opened the Boucvalt Family Athletic Complex located at the south end-zone of John L. Guidry Stadium featuring upgraded locker and training rooms, field-level coach offices, and a 110-seat meeting room. The current playing surface is GeoGreen Replicated Grass. The stadium was officially dedicated on September 16, 1972.
Football Practice FieldsThe football practice fields include three natural grass football practice fields located across Acadia Drive from Manning Field at John L. Guidry Stadium, the Frank L. Barker Athletic Building and the Leonard C. Chabert Strength and Conditioning Facility. Two of the fields face in a north-south configuration similar to Manning Field at John L. Guidry Stadium with a third facing in an east-west configuration.
Stopher GymnasiumStopher Gymnasium is a 3,800-seat multi-purpose arena in Thibodaux, Louisiana. It is home to the Nicholls Colonels men's and women's basketball teams and women's volleyball team. It opened in 1970.
Ben Meyer Diamond at Ray E. Didier FieldBen Meyer Diamond at Ray E. Didier Field is a baseball venue in Thibodaux, Louisiana. It is home to the Nicholls Colonels baseball team of the NCAA Division I in the Southland Conference. The venue has a capacity of 2,100.
Colonel Tennis ComplexThe Colonel Tennis Complex is a tennis venue in Thibodaux, Louisiana. It is home to the Nicholls Colonels men's and women's tennis teams of the NCAA Division I in the Southland Conference.
LaTour Golf ClubThe LaTour Golf Club located in Mathews, Louisiana, is the home golf course of the Nicholls Colonels men's golf team of the NCAA Division I in the Southland Conference. It is an 18-hole, 7,170 yard, 72 par course and includes an on-site practice facility.
Nicholls FarmNicholls Farm is the home course for the Nicholls Colonels cross country teams in Thibodaux, Louisiana. It is a 277-acre farm located three miles south of Nicholls’ campus. 
Nicholls Golf ComplexThe Nicholls Golf Complex is the driving range complex located on the campus of Nicholls State University in Thibodaux, Louisiana. It is a practice venue for the Nicholls Colonels men's golf team of the NCAA Division I in the Southland Conference.
Nicholls Soccer ComplexThe Nicholls Soccer Complex is a soccer venue in Thibodaux, Louisiana. It is home to the Nicholls Colonels women's soccer team of the NCAA Division I in the Southland Conference. The venue has a capacity of 1,000.
Swanner Field at Geo Surfaces ParkSwanner Field at Geo Surfaces Park is a softball venue in Thibodaux, Louisiana. It is home to the Nicholls Colonels softball team of the NCAA Division I in the Southland Conference. The venue has a capacity of 500.
Frank L. Barker Athletic BuildingThe Frank L. Barker Athletic Building or Barker Hall is the athletic administration, football and baseball building for the Nicholls Colonels. The building also houses the Nicholls Colonels Athletics Hall of Fame.
Leonard C. Chabert Strength and Conditioning FacilityThe Nicholls Colonels strength and conditioning facility is located inside the Leonard C. Chabert Strength and Conditioning Facility or Leonard C. Chabert Hall. It includes the weight room and nutrition center for Nicholls athletics.

Former athletic facilities
Atchafalaya Golf Course at Idlewild — Men's golf (2015–2018)
Shaver Gymnasium — Men's basketball (1958–1969)

Nicholls Colonels traditions

Nicholls State University Alma Mater
The name of the "official" Alma Mater for Nicholls State University is "Nicholls State University Alma Mater."

Nicholls Colonels Fight Song
The name of the "official" fight song for Nicholls State University is "Nicholls Colonels Fight Song."

Pride of Nicholls Marching Band

The "Pride of Nicholls" Marching Band is the marching band which represents Nicholls State University in Thibodaux, Louisiana.

Colonel Tillou

"Colonel Tillou" is the official athletics mascot for Nicholls State University. The modern version of Col. Tillou wears a bright red uniform topped off with a contemporary-style military officer's cap.

Nicholls School Colors
The "official" school colors for Nicholls are red and gray.

Nicholls Colonelettes and Colorguard
The Nicholls Colonelettes are the Nicholls dance team. This group performs at all home football games, one away football game, and all home basketball games. They participate in all pep rallies.

The Nicholls Colorguard performs at all home football games.

Nicholls Cheerleaders
The Nicholls Cheerleaders are the co-ed cheerleading squad for the Nicholls Colonels. The cheerleaders perform at football games, basketball games and pep rallies in addition to a number of public relations and charitable events each year.

Rivalries
The Nicholls sports teams maintain a conference rivalry with the Southeastern Louisiana sports teams, but the main rivalry is in football where the teams compete in the annual River Bell Classic. The Nicholls sports teams also compete against conference rival Northwestern State and in football the teams play in the annual NSU Challenge.

Nicholls State University Athletics Hall of Fame

The purpose of the Nicholls State University Athletics Hall of Fame is to strengthen and perpetuate athletic tradition at the university. Members in the Athletics Hall of Fame shall consist only of those outstanding persons whose dedication and performance merit the great honors that the University can bestow.

The Hall of Fame is located on the campus of Nicholls State University in the Frank L. Barker Athletic Building.

Colonel Athletic Association 
The Colonel Athletic Association is the fundraising organization for the Nicholls State University athletics department. The athletic association helps to provide support to Nicholls' student-athletes and also focuses on fundraising activities for facility enhancements and operating expenses.

Athletic directors 

# denotes interim athletic director

Broadcast information

Nicholls Colonels Radio Network
The Nicholls Colonels Radio Network is the radio network of the Nicholls Colonels men's and women's sports teams. It consists of several radio stations throughout the state of Louisiana.

The list of participating stations are:
KLRZ 100.3 FM in Larose, Louisiana (flagship)
KLEB 1600 AM in Golden Meadow, Louisiana
KNSU 91.5 FM in Thibodaux, Louisiana

Streaming services
Nicholls Colonels games can be streamed online for free at Colonels All-Access. It is a video subscription service available through the Nicholls athletics department where viewers can watch a live stream of all non-televised home football, men’s and women’s basketball, baseball and volleyball events.

See also
List of NCAA Division I institutions

References

External links
 

 
Sports teams in Thibodaux, Louisiana